Michelle Mae is an American musician from the state of Washington, who is known for playing in rock 'n' roll groups such as The Make-Up and Weird War.

Biography
Mae began playing with underground bands in Olympia, Washington in the mid-1990s, including a single recording with Witchy Poo, and a period with Kill Rock Stars artists The Frumpies before moving to Washington, D.C. to help form The Make-Up in 1995.  After The Make-Up dissolved in 2000, Mae joined Weird War with some of her former Make-Up band mates.

Her style is heavily funk inflected, influenced by Funkadelic's Billy "Bass" Nelson, Larry Graham, and  The Slits, as well as Northwest stalwarts Dead Moon.

Typically focusing on the bass guitar, in Weird War she plays a Fender Jazz Bass through a Sunn cabinet, though in The Make-Up she often played Hagström and Epiphone guitars through Kustom amplifiers.

Mae is based in Washington, D.C., where she continues to work as a musician and practitioner of mysticism.

Discography

Witchy Poo

7 inch singles
Mixed Metaphor (Kill Rock Stars/5RC) (released 1995, recorded 1992-1994)

The Frumpies

Albums
Frumpie One Piece (Kill Rock Stars/5RC) (1998)

7 inch singles
Babies & Bunnies (Kill Rock Stars/5RC) (1993)
Safety First (Wiiija) (1993)

The Make-Up

Studio albums

Destination: Love - Live! At Cold Rice (Dischord) (1996)
Sound Verite (K Records) (1997)
In Mass Mind (Dischord) (1998)
Save Yourself (K Records) (1999)
I Want Some (singles compilation) (K Records) (1999)

Live albums
After Dark (Dischord) (1997)
Untouchable Sound - Live! (Drag City/Sea Note) (2006)

DVD / video

Blue is Beautiful (included on In Film/On Video) (Dischord) (1998)
In Film/On Video (Dischord) (2006)

Weird War

Studio albums
Weird War (Drag City) (2002)
I Suck on that Emotion (as Scene Creamers) (Drag City) (2003)
If You Can't Beat 'Em, Bite 'Em (Drag City) (2004)
Illuminated by the Light (Drag City) (2005)

DVD / video
appears on Burn to Shine 01: Washington DC 01.14.2004 (Trixie) (2005)

References

External links
Official Weird War website

American rock bass guitarists
American women guitarists
Women bass guitarists
Living people
Year of birth missing (living people)
Guitarists from Washington (state)
The Frumpies members
The Make-Up members
Weird War members
21st-century American women